McVitty House, also known as the Inn at Burwell Place, is a historic home located at Salem, Virginia. It was built in 1906 and expanded with a substantial addition in 1925.  It is a -story, "L"-shaped, Colonial Revival style frame dwelling. It features a full-length wrap-around porch with Tuscan columns, elaborate dormers, stunning fanlight windows and an attached sun/sleeping porch. The house is operated as a bed and breakfast.

It was added to the National Register of Historic Places in 2003.

References

External links
Inn at Burwell Place website

Bed and breakfasts in Virginia
Houses on the National Register of Historic Places in Virginia
Colonial Revival architecture in Virginia
Houses completed in 1906
Houses in Salem, Virginia
National Register of Historic Places in Salem, Virginia
1906 establishments in Virginia